Wylder is a commune in the Nord department in northern France.

The confluence of the Peene Becque and Yser rivers is located in Wylder.

Population

Heraldry

See also
Communes of the Nord department

References

Communes of Nord (French department)
French Flanders